The Diocese of Essen is a bishopric of the Catholic Church in Germany, founded on 1 January 1958. The Bishop of Essen is seated in Essen Cathedral (Essener Dom or Essener Münster), once the church of Essen Abbey, and over one thousand years old.

The diocese contains about one million Catholics in the heavily urbanized and industrial Ruhr Area.

Bishops
Franz Hengsbach (1957–1991)
Hubert Luthe (1991–2002)
Felix Genn (2003–2008)
Franz-Josef Overbeck (since 20 December 2009); he was appointed Bishop of the Military Ordinariate of Germany, while remaining Bishop of Essen, by Pope Benedict XVI on 24 February 2011.

Auxiliary bishops
Ludger Schepers
Wilhelm Zimmermann

See also
Essen

Notes

External links
 GCatholic.org

Roman Catholic dioceses in Germany
Christian organizations established in 1958
1958 establishments in West Germany